The 2016–17 Central Connecticut Blue Devils men's basketball team represented Central Connecticut State University during the 2016–17 NCAA Division I men's basketball season. The Blue Devils, led by first-year head coach Donyell Marshall, played their home games at the William H. Detrick Gymnasium in New Britain, Connecticut as members of the Northeast Conference. They finished the season 6–23, 4–14 in NEC play to finish in ninth place. They failed to qualify for the NEC tournament.

Previous season 
The Blue Devils finished the 2015–16 season 4–25, 3–15 in NEC play to finish in last place. They failed to qualify for the NEC tournament.

On April 6, 2016, the school announced Donyell Marshall as the 10th head coach in program history. Marshall replaced Howie Dickenman, who retired after 20 years at Central Connecticut.

Roster

Schedule and results

|-
!colspan=9 style=| Exhibition
  
|-
!colspan=9 style=| Non-conference regular season

   

 
|-
!colspan=9 style=| NEC regular season

References

Central Connecticut Blue Devils men's basketball seasons
Central Connecticut
Central Connecticut Blue Devils men's basketball
Central Connecticut Blue Devils men's basketball